Schoolcraft Township is the name of some places in the U.S. state of Michigan:

 Schoolcraft Township, Houghton County, Michigan
 Schoolcraft Township, Kalamazoo County, Michigan

Michigan township disambiguation pages